Longwave is a 2013 Swiss-French-Portuguese comedy-drama film directed by Lionel Baier.  The film's principal cast are Valérie Donzelli, Michel Vuillermoz, Patrick Lapp, and Francisco Belard.

Plot
The film is set in 1974, based on a true story about a Swiss production team working for Radio Suisse Romande, who are assigned to produce a puff piece in Portugal but instead witness the Carnation Revolution.

Release
The film débuted at the 2013 Locarno Film Festival. The US premiere of Longwave was at the Palm Springs International Film Festival on January 10, 2014. The distributor in France is Happiness Distribution, and in Switzerland is Pathé; the film has also been sold to Zeta Films for distribution in Argentina, Uruguay, Chile, and Paraguay.

Reception
The reviewer for Variety found that the director had demonstrated "his thoroughgoing knowledge of and delight in film history, yet his striving for a 1970s screwball vibe feels too forced and artificial". In Público's Ípsilon, Luís Miguel Oliveira gave the film two out of five stars.

The film was nominated for the Swiss Film Award in three categories: Best Fiction Film, Best Screenplay (Lionel Baier and Julien Bouissoux), and Best Actor (Patrick Lapp)  but did not win, losing to I Am the Keeper in each category.

References

External links
 Official site
 IMDb
 CinEuropa
 SwissFilms

1974 in Portugal
2010s historical comedy-drama films
2013 films
Carnation Revolution
Films about revolutions
Films set in 1974
Films set in Portugal
Films set in Switzerland
Films shot in Portugal
French historical comedy-drama films
2010s French-language films
Portuguese comedy-drama films
Portuguese historical films
2010s Portuguese-language films
Swiss historical comedy-drama films
2013 comedy films
2013 drama films
2013 multilingual films
French multilingual films
Portuguese multilingual films
Swiss multilingual films
French-language Swiss films
2010s French films